Elections for the Pennsylvania State Senate were held on November 7, 2000, with even-numbered districts being contested. State Senators are elected for four-year terms, with half of the Senate seats up for a vote every two years. The term of office for those elected in 2000 ran from January 3, 2001 until November 30, 2004. Necessary primary elections were held on April 27, 2004.

The make-up of the senate remained the same following the 2000 elections. Democratic Mike Stack defeated incumbent Republican Frank A. Salvatore in the 5th senatorial district. Republican Donald C. White defeated the democratic nominee to succeed the retiring Patrick J. Stapleton, Jr. in the 41st senatorial district. Democratic Sean Logan succeeded the retiring Albert V. Belan.

Republican Bill Slocum remained on the ballot in the 25th senatorial district, even after his resignation from the senate on June 1, 2000. Slocum pleaded guilty and spent a month in federal prison for filing false reports to the Pennsylvania Department of Environmental Protection and discharging raw sewage into Brokenstraw Creek while he was a sewage plant manager in Youngsville, Pennsylvania. The local Republican party supported the eventual winner, Joseph B. Scarnati III, who ran as an independent and changed his party registration to Republican after his election.

General election

References
 
 
 

Senate
2000
Pennsylvania Senate